Kristian Eidnes Andersen (born 2 July 1966) is a Danish film audio engineer and composer. He heads the department of sound design at the National Film School of Denmark.

Eidnes Andersen got a degree from the National Film School of Denmark, and has been sound designer on more than 80 films. He has worked with Lars von Trier on e.g. Dancer in the Dark, Breaking the Waves, Manderlay, and Antichrist. For his sound in Antichrist, Eidnes Andersen received a Bodil Special Award.

As a score composer, Eidnes Andersen has credit for more than 20 titles including von Triers Antichrist, Thomas Vinterberg's Submarino, and Per Fly's The Woman That Dreamed About a Man.

Filmography

References

External links 

Danish film score composers
1966 births
Living people
Place of birth missing (living people)
Bodil Special Award recipients